The George S. and Dolores Doré Eccles Theater (commonly shortened to the Eccles Theater) is located in Salt Lake City, Utah. It was opened in 2016. It hosts touring Broadway shows, concerts, and other entertainment events. The primary "Delta Performance Hall" seats 2,468 people, while a smaller black box theater (the "Regent Street theater") seats 150-250 people.

References

Theatres in Utah
Buildings and structures in Salt Lake City
Tourist attractions in Salt Lake City
2016 establishments in Utah